Laura Golarsa (born 27 November 1967) is a former Italian professional tennis player.

Golarsa was born in Milan and played on the WTA Tour from 1985 to 2001. She did not win any senior titles but did reach the quarterfinals of Wimbledon in 1989. Her singles record included victories over Zina Garrison and Jana Novotná. She won six doubles titles on the WTA Tour and achieved a career-high doubles ranking of No. 23 in August 1995.

WTA career finals

Singles: 1 (runner-up)

Doubles: 14 (6 titles, 8 runner-ups)

ITF Circuit finals

Singles (6–4)

Doubles (3–3)

External links
 
 

1967 births
Hopman Cup competitors
Italian female tennis players
Living people
Tennis players from Milan
Mediterranean Games silver medalists for Italy
Mediterranean Games medalists in tennis
Competitors at the 1983 Mediterranean Games
20th-century Italian women